The McMullin-Warren House, at 301 W. Main St. in Sebree, Kentucky, is a Queen Anne-style house built in 1901.  It was listed on the National Register of Historic Places in 1988.

It was deemed notable as "the most distinctive architectural landmark in Sebree."

References

Houses on the National Register of Historic Places in Kentucky
Queen Anne architecture in Kentucky
Houses completed in 1901
National Register of Historic Places in Webster County, Kentucky
1901 establishments in Kentucky